VGF may refer to:
 VGF, a secreted protein and neuropeptide precursor
 Vereinigte Glanzstoff-Fabriken, the German rayon manufacturer
 Vein graft failure, a condition in which vein grafts, which are used as alternative conduits in bypass surgeries, get occluded
 Aerovista Gulf Express, the ICAO code VGF
 Viability gap funding, a grant to support projects